Achraf Madi (born 27 June 2002) is a Dutch professional footballer who plays as a midfielder for Eerste Divisie club Telstar.

Club career
On 30 January 2023, Madi signed with Telstar.

References

2002 births
Living people
Dutch footballers
Association football midfielders
FC Twente players
Sparta Rotterdam players
SC Telstar players
Eredivisie players
Tweede Divisie players